Swapan may refer to:

Swapan Bauri, Indian politician
Swapan Bhattacharjee (born 1952), Bangladesh Awami League politician
Swapan Sadhan Bose (born 1948), Indian politician, Member of the Parliament of India
Swapan Kumar Chakravorty (1954–2021), Indian academic, Professor of Humanities at the Presidency University, Kolkata
Swapan Chattopadhyay CorrFRSE (born 1951), Indian American physicist
Swapan Chaudhuri (born 1945), Indian tabla player
Swapan Das (born 1990), Indian first-class cricketer
Swapan Dasgupta (born 1955), Indian journalist and politician
Swapan Kumar Datta (born 1953), scientist (Professor) of rice biotechnology
Moni Swapan Dewan (18 May 1954) is a Bangladesh Nationalist Party politician, former Member of Parliament
Swapan K. Gayen, Bengali-American physicist
Swapan Guha, Indian entrepreneur, Fellow of the Indian Institute of Ceramics
Swapan Majumder, Indian politician from Bharatiya Janata Party
Swapan Kumar Pati (born 1968), Indian quantum chemist, a professor of chemistry
Swapan Saha (born 1930), Indian Srestho Bengali film director
Swapan Sen (born 1951), Indian former cricketer
Abu Sayeed Al Mahmud Swapan, Bangladesh Awami League politician, Member of Parliament
Shafiqul Ghani Swapan, Bangladeshi politician, former chairman of Bangladesh National Awami Party-Bangladesh
Shafiqul Islam Swapan, Bangladeshi cinematographer
Zahir Uddin Swapan, Bangladesh Nationalist Party politician, former Member of Parliament,

See also
Swamp Man
Swapaanam
Swapna (disambiguation)